The 159th Aviation Regiment is an aviation regiment of the U.S. Army.

History

Initially formed from assets of the 308th Aviation Battalion (Combat), the 159th Aviation Battalion (Assault Support Helicopter) was constituted on 1 July 1968 and served in the Regular Army in Vietnam as a part of the 101st Airborne Division (Airmobile). 

Its Company B was reorganized and redesignated on 16 November 1987 as Headquarters and Headquarters Company, 2d Battalion, 159th Aviation; however, it was inactivated 10 years later on 15 September 1997 before being redesignated on 16 October 1997 as Company B, 159th Aviation, and activated at Hunter Army Airfield, Georgia. Later it moved to Felker Army Airfield at Fort Eustis, VA. HHC and B Company were deployed in Kuwait and Iraq between February 2003 and April 2004, before being inactivated a month later on 15 May 2004 at Ft. Eustis. 

The 159th Aviation Regiment was redesignated to the same company on 1 October 2005 before it was redesignated again a year later 16 October 2006 as Headquarters and Headquarters Company, 2d Battalion.

Numerous other elements of the regiment have been active as well:

3d Battalion, 159th Aviation Regiment

5th Battalion, 159th Aviation Regiment

Company I, 159th Aviation Regiment

Company K, 159th Aviation Regiment

Current structure

 1st Battalion
 Company A
 Kuwait/ Iraq/ Southwest Asia 1990 - 1991
 Company B
 Kuwait/ Iraq/ Southwest Asia 1990 - 1991
 2nd Battalion
 Company A
 Afghanistan Sep 2009 - Apr 2010
 Afghanistan Aug 2010 - Nov 2010
 5th Battalion (General Support)
 Headquarters and Headquarters Company (HHC) "Dragon Masters"
 Iraq-2019 (OIR)
 Company A "Ghost Riders"
 Southwest Asia 1990 - 1991
 Iraq 2019 (OIR)
 Company B "Freight Train"
 Kuwait/ Iraq Feb 2003- Apr 2004
 Iraq 2009-2010
 Afghanistan June 2016- May 2017
 Company C (WY ARNG) (HH-60) "Bourbon Dustoff"
 Afghanistan Dec 2008 – Dec 2009
 Afghanistan Nov 2015 - June 2016
 Iraq 2019
 Company D "Dark Wolves"
 Iraq 2019
Company E
 Company G "Devil Rays Dustoff"
 Detachment 1
 Iraq May 2019

Campaign Participation Credit

Vietnam 
 Counteroffensive, Phase V
 Counteroffensive, Phase VI
 Tet 69/Counteroffensive
 Summer-Fall 1969
 Winter-Spring 1970
 Sanctuary Counteroffensive
 Counteroffensive, Phase VII
 Consolidation I
 Consolidation II

Southwest Asia 
 Defense of Saudi Arabia
 Liberation and Defense of Kuwait

War on Terrorism

Iraq 
 Iraqi Surge
 Iraqi Sovereignty
 OIR

References

159